Eastwood was a county constituency represented in the House of Commons of the Parliament of the United Kingdom from 1983 until 2005.  It elected one Member of Parliament (MP) by the first-past-the-post system of election.

History 
The constituency was created for the 1983 general election, when it partially replaced the former East Renfrewshire constituency, following changes in 1975 to local government boundaries.

The East Renfrewshire constituency was re-established for the 2005 general election, with the same boundaries as the Eastwood constituency. Despite the change of name, it is the only constituency in mainland Scotland whose boundaries were unchanged by the 2005 revision of Scottish constituencies.

In 1999, an Eastwood Scottish Parliament constituency was created with the name and boundaries of the Eastwood Westminster constituency. However, while this constituency still exists, its boundaries are now different from the East Renfrewshire UK Parliament seat.

Boundaries 

The constituency lay to the south of Glasgow and included Clarkston, Newton Mearns, Eaglesham, Barrhead and Neilston.

Members of Parliament

Election results

Elections of the 1980s

Elections of the 1990s

Elections of the 2000s

References 

Historic parliamentary constituencies in Scotland (Westminster)
Constituencies of the Parliament of the United Kingdom established in 1983
Constituencies of the Parliament of the United Kingdom disestablished in 2005
Politics of East Renfrewshire
Clarkston, East Renfrewshire
Giffnock
Politics of Renfrewshire
Newton Mearns
Eaglesham